Francisco Delgado Melo (born 13 November 1943 in Plasencia, Spain) is a former Spanish footballer.

He played for Atlético de Madrid between 1968 and 1976, winning the Spanish League in 1970 and 1973, and the Intercontinental Cup in 1975. He played in the 1974 European Cup Final, which Atlético lost.

References

External links

1943 births
Living people
Spanish footballers
Atlético Madrid footballers
Association football defenders
Spain international footballers